Jerry Lee Armstrong (born June 26, 1936) is a retired American amateur boxer. He competed in the bantamweight division at the 1960 Summer Olympics and finished in fifth place.

Armstrong served with the U.S. Army and then graduated from Idaho State College. He later worked for 29 years at the Idaho Department of Health and Welfare, retiring in 1998 as personnel director. In the meantime he also refereed about 100 professional boxing matches. In 1980 he was inducted to the Idaho State University Hall of Fame.

References

1936 births
Living people
People from Petoskey, Michigan
Boxers from Michigan
Bantamweight boxers
Olympic boxers of the United States
Boxers at the 1960 Summer Olympics
United States Army soldiers
American male boxers
Idaho State University alumni